Haydock Park Racecourse is a racecourse in Merseyside, North West England. Within the boundaries of the historic county of Lancashire, the racecourse is set in an area of parkland bounded by the towns of Haydock to the west, Ashton-in-Makerfield to the north, Golborne to the east and Newton-le-Willows to the south. Horse racing had been run in Newton for many years (the great racemare Queen of Trumps won at Newton in 1836), and the venue was also used for hare coursing in the 1880s. The current racecourse was opened in 1899. Much of the course's early development was overseen by Sydney Sandon, who served as course secretary, chairman and managing director in the early 20th century.

Facilities

The track is a mostly flat left-handed oval of around 1 mile 5 furlongs with a slight rise on the four and a half furlong run-in. An extension or "chute" to the straight allows sprints of up to six furlongs to be run on a straight course. There are courses for flat racing and National Hunt racing.

The facilities include a champagne bar.

It was awarded Racecourse of the Year in 1998 and 2000.

Notable races

References

Bibliography

External links
Official website
Course guide on GG.COM
Course guide on At The Races

 
Horse racing venues in England
Sport in the Metropolitan Borough of St Helens
Sports venues in Merseyside
Tourist attractions in Merseyside
Sports venues completed in 1899
1899 establishments in England